Irmakköy is a village in the Hasankeyf District of Batman Province in Turkey. The village is populated by Kurds of the Derhawî tribe and had a population of 280 in 2021.

The hamlet of Kavacık is attached to the village.

References 

Villages in Hasankeyf District
Kurdish settlements in Batman Province